Rogers Independent School District is a public school district based in Rogers, Texas (USA).

Located in Bell County, a small portion of the district extends into Milam County.

In 2009, the school district was rated "academically acceptable" by the Texas Education Agency.

Schools
Rogers High School (Grades 9-12)
Rogers Middle School (Grades 6-8)
Rogers Elementary School (Grades PK-5)

References

External links
Rogers ISD

School districts in Bell County, Texas
School districts in Milam County, Texas